Dumitru Dămăceanu (17 July 1896 – 27 September 1978) was a Romanian army officer in World War II, later promoted to brigadier-general, who played a predominant role in the royal coup of August 23, 1944.

Military and diplomatic career

Before World War II
Dămăceanu was born in the village of Cosmești, in Galați County, Romania. He attended the Costache Negruzzi Boarding High School of Iași, and then the Military School for Cavalry Officers in Târgoviște, graduating in 1916 with the rank of second lieutenant. He then fought in the Romanian campaign of World War I with the 6th Regiment Roșiori.  After the war, he pursued his military education at Infantry Officer School in Sibiu (1923) and the Military Academy of Turin (1929).

In between the world wars, he was military attaché in Rome, Italy, director at the Voievodul Mihai School, and adjutant to King Carol II. He was promoted to lieutenant colonel in 1938 and colonel in 1940.

During World War II
From 1941 to 1942 he was commanding officer of the 10th Roșiori Cavalry Regiment, fighting on the Eastern Front. From 1942 to 1944 he was Chief of Staff of the Capital Military Command. He was awarded the Order of Michael the Brave, 3rd class in October 1941 and the Order of the Star of Romania, Officer class, in July 1942.

August 23, 1944 coup d'état
Colonel Dămăceanu participated in the August 23, 1944 coup d'état led by King Michael I against the government of Marshal Ion Antonescu. He organized and coordinated the military actions and resistance in Bucharest. On August 29, he was promoted to brigadier general. By the end of August 1944, he travelled to Moscow with a Romanian delegation; they were received by Soviet Foreign Minister Vyacheslav Molotov on August 30 or 31. On September 12, 1944, General Dămăceanu was one of the plenipotentiary signatories of the Armistice Agreement between Romania and the Soviet Union (the other signatories were Lucrețiu Pătrășcanu, and Barbu Știrbey on the Romanian side, and Rodion Malinovsky on the Soviet side).

Paris Peace Conference

In 1946, he was a member of the Gheorghe Tătărescu-led Romanian delegation to the Paris World War II Peace Conference. The Peace Treaty with Romania was signed in Paris on February 10, 1947, in the Salon de l'Horloge of the Ministère des Affaires Étrangères. On the Romanian side, the four signatories were Gheorghe Tătărescu (Council Vice-President), Lucrețiu Pătrășcanu (Minister of Justice), Ștefan Voitec (Minister of National Education), and Dămăceanu (Under-Secretary – Ministry of War). Other signatories included James F. Byrnes (US Secretary of State, for the United States), Vyacheslav Molotov (Foreign Affairs Minister, for the Soviet Union), and Ernest Bevin (Foreign Affairs Secretary, for the United Kingdom).

1944–1947
In August 1946 he advanced in rank to major general. Later on, Dămăceanu was promoted to colonel general.

From August 23, 1944, to December 30, 1947, he was Under-Secretary of State at the Ministry of Interior, Council of Ministers, Ministry of War-Land Forces.

Under the communist regime

Persecution
After King Michael's forced abdication on December 30, 1947 and the complete Communist takeover, Dămăceanu was removed from the army. During the early 1950s he was degraded, arrested, tried and sentenced to serve time in prison.

Rehabilitation
After being released, during the 1960s, he was rehabilitated, receiving back his military rank – as a reserve officer. In 1974 he was promoted from the rank of colonel general to that of army general by presidential decree. The gymnasium in Cosmești now bears his name, as does a street in his native town.

Private life
In 1932 he married Georgeta Stroescu (born October 1912, died March 1996), and they had a daughter, Gabriela Romana Dămăceanu, born in May 1938 in Rome, Italy, while he was a military attaché.

References

External links
 
 "Dimitri D. Dimăncescu, 1896-1984", at the Honorary Consulate of Romania in Boston, has a photograph of Dumitru Dămăceanu at the Paris Peace Conference in 1946
  Cristina Diac and Florin Mihai,  "1939-1944: 23 august, Cronica unui dezastru", in Jurnalul Național, August 23, 2006.
 Andreea Sminchise, "Centenarii României – 'Pacepa mi-a distrus băiatul...'", in Jurnalul Național, March 27, 2007.

1896 births
1976 deaths
Romanian delegation to the Paris Peace Conference of 1946
Members of the Chamber of Deputies (Romania)
Romanian diplomats
Romanian Land Forces generals
Romanian military personnel of World War II
Romanian expatriates in Italy
Recipients of the Order of Michael the Brave
Officers of the Order of the Star of Romania
People from Galați County
Costache Negruzzi National College alumni
Romanian military personnel of World War I
Romanian prisoners and detainees
Socialist Republic of Romania rehabilitations
Prisoners and detainees of Romania